Jodi Marr is an American songwriter and record producer. She won a Latin Grammy Award in 2003 for "De Verdad" on the album Soy by Alejandra Guzmán.  She is best known for her collaboration on multiple songs with Casablanca/Universal artist MIKA including 'Grace Kelly', 'Love You When I'm Drunk', 'Make You Happy' and more.  She also collaborated with UK artist Paloma Faith's 2009 debut album, co-writing and co-producing the single 'New York'.

References

Year of birth missing (living people)
Living people
American women songwriters
American women record producers
21st-century American women